

Station list

F